Store Egholm is a small Danish island in the South Funen Archipelago, lying 5 kilometers north west of Ærøskøbing, and close to Lille Egholm. Store Egholm covers an area of 0.7 km2, and is currently uninhabited

References 

Danish islands in the Baltic
Islands of Denmark
Geography of Svendborg Municipality